Aethionectes is a genus of beetles in the family Dytiscidae found in sub-Saharan Africa and Madagascar.

The genus Aethionectes contains the following six species:
 Aethionectes apicalis (Boheman, 1848)
 Aethionectes eremita Bilardo & Rocchi, 2017
 Aethionectes flammulatus Zimmermann, 1928
 Aethionectes fulvonotatus (Clark, 1864)
 Aethionectes irroratus Guignot, 1952
 Aethionectes oberthueri (Régimbart, 1895)

References

Dytiscidae genera